The Webster Avenue Bridge (also known as the Smith's Lane Bridge and the D'Oench Bridge) is a road bridge over the Long Island Rail Road's Port Washington Branch between the Long Island villages of Plandome Heights and Flower Hill.

Description 

The Webster Avenue Bridge was built in 1898 using a steel-stringer design. The bridge carries two lanes of Webster Avenue/Bridge Road - as well as a sidewalk - over the Port Washington Branch of the LIRR, from Brookwold Drive in Plandome Heights to Pinewood Road in Flower Hill.

The bridge's New York State bridge identification number is NY 2261210.

History 
The bridge was constructed in order to allow for traffic to safely cross the Long Island Rail Road's Port Washington Branch, which was extended from Great Neck to Port Washington around the same time. The bridge was rehabilitated in 1953.

By 1979, the bridge's structural integrity severely weakened from the several decades of constant use, which was a major concern for many locals – including then-North Hempstead Town Supervisor Michael J. Tully Jr. (who was, at one point, a Flower Hill resident himself). The bridge was in such poor shape that it was closed by the Town of North Hempstead for repairs on April 20, 1979, following a safety warning from a state inspector that "90 percent" of the bridge was severely deteriorated; the bridge previously had to have its maximum weight limit reduced by the Town of North Hempstead, due to the structural deficiencies.

Tully requested that the bridge be repaired with federal aid as part of a government infrastructure program in 1979. This request for federal aid was denied – despite the fact that several other bridges on Long Island in similar shape were being rehabilitated with federal aid.

The bridge received more repairs in December 2015, and received a weight limit of 3 tons and a height clearance of 8 feet, 6 inches (2.6 meters), due to the bridge's poor structural integrity and overall deterioration. Height barriers were placed on both ends of the bridge to prevent taller vehicles from traversing the bridge, and weight limit signs were posted on both ends; school buses were rerouted to bypass the bridge.

Despite these repairs, the bridge's condition continues to deteriorate, much to the dismay of locals. As of 2019, the sidewalk is severely damaged after decades of being exposed to the elements, and the steel grate road deck is fractured in many places; welded steel plates are used to keep the roadway intact.

Replacement 
The Webster Avenue Bridge is slated to be replaced with a new bridge built to modern standards. This announcement was made in 2019, after major concerns were expressed from locals over the bridge's functional obsoleteness, increasing noise, state of disrepair, and structural weakness.

The preliminary design for a future replacement bridge had already been performed between 2017 and 2019, and the new bridge is slated to be built as part of the MTA's 2020–2024 Capital Program.

The new Webster Avenue Bridge is anticipated to be completed by 2023.

See also 

 Manhasset Viaduct - another bridge on the LIRR's Port Washington Branch, located slightly to the west.

References 

Flower Hill, New York
Manhasset, New York
Long Island Rail Road
Bridges in Nassau County, New York